Aethalopteryx obscurascens is a moth in the family Cossidae. It is found in Ethiopia.

References

Moths described in 1930
Aethalopteryx